École nationale supérieure de chimie de Rennes (ENSCR) a French engineering College created in 1919.

The school trains engineers in chemistry.

Located in Rennes, the ENSCR is a public higher education institution. The school is a member of the University of Rennes 1.

References

External links
 ENSCR

Engineering universities and colleges in France
ENSCR
Rennes
Educational institutions established in 1919
1919 establishments in France